Mark Donald Craig (born 23 March 1987) is a New Zealand Test cricketer who plays first-class cricket for Otago. A spin bowler, he bowls right-arm off spin, and bats left-handed. He fields predominantly at second-slip.

Domestic career
In June 2018, he was awarded a contract with Otago for the 2018–19 season.

International career
Craig made his Test cricket debut for New Zealand against the West Indies in June 2014, winning the man of the match award for match bowling figures of 8 for 188.
Craig has also shown the ability to bat  in tight situations for his team, with his high score of 67 coming in a 4-hour stand with BJ Watling.

Craig is the first batsman to hit the first ball he faced in Test cricket for six. He was also the fourth batsman in Test cricket to get off the mark by scoring a six and the first New Zealand player to achieve this milestone. Craig also spent two seasons in England playing for Coombs Wood Cricket Club in the Worcestershire League in 2005/06.

References

External links
 

1987 births
Living people
New Zealand cricketers
New Zealand Test cricketers
New Zealand expatriate sportspeople in England
Otago cricketers
Cricketers from Auckland